Anabaraspis is a genus of redlichiid trilobite. A. splendens occurs in the uppermost Lower Cambrian and lowest Middle Cambrian of Russia (Toyonian and lower Amgan, A. splendens and Oryctocara Zones, northwestern and southeastern Yakutia). In Anabaraspis there is a long area in front of the glabella which is not differentiated in a border and a preglabellar field. This is a unique character in the family Paradoxididae. The frontal lobe of the central raised area (or glabella) of the headshield (or cephalon) is slightly pointed, rather than rounded or truncate, a character shared with Plutonides, though, in Plutonides it hangs over the short anterior border.

Description 
The exoskeleton of Anabaraspis is relatively flat, oval to inverted egg-shaped. The glabella subpentagonal with a blunt frontal tip, and widest near the back of the frontal lobe. The glabella is divided into three rings by furrows that cross the midline, although the most frontal of these is shallow in the middle. In front of that may be two faint sets of furrows that do not cross-over. The area in front of the glabella is relatively long (about ⅓× the length of the glabella), and not differentiated into a preglabellar field and the anterior border. The facial suture in front of the eye is long and strongly divergent, while the portion behind the eye isshort. The genal spine is short and stout. The articulate middle part of the body (or thorax) has 15 to 18 segments with long, sickle-shaped spines. The inner part of the ribs is about as wide as the axis. The tailshield (or pygidium) is longer than wide, slightly hexagonal, with a long, flat posterior area. The rear margin of the pygidium is truncate or indented. The pygidial axis is short, with 1 axial ring. The surface is smooth.

References 

Cambrian trilobites
Paradoxidoidea
Fossils of Russia
Fossil taxa described in 1951